Route OSR or Highway OSR may refer to:
 Texas State Highway OSR
Old San Antonio Road